Events in the year 2023 in Afghanistan.

According to the United Nations Development Programme, by 2022, 97% of Afghans could fall under the poverty threshold, which would plunge the country into a major humanitarian crisis heading into 2023.

In January 2023, the Taliban officials reported deaths of at least 157 people due to Afghanistan’s harsh winter. The number had doubled in less than a week. The impact was worsened after the Taliban banned female NGO workers.

Incumbents

Events

Ongoing 
 Afghanistan conflict (1978–present)
 Islamic State–Taliban conflict
 Republican insurgency in Afghanistan
 COVID-19 pandemic in Afghanistan

January 
 1 January: 
 2023 Kabul airport bombing: According to the interior minister of the Taliban government, a bombing took place at the military airport of Kabul, causing several casualties.
 A 4.7 magnitude earthquake is recorded in Jorm, Badakhshan Province.
 United Nations official Markus Potzel meets Taliban deputy prime minister, Maulvi Abdul Salam Hanafi, to discuss a ban preventing women from working in non-governmental organizations.
10 January - 2023 Afghanistan blizzard: A cold wave begins, causing 166 deaths, mostly shepherds and other people living in rural areas.
11 January - An Islamic State – Khorasan Province suicide bomber kills at least 20 people in Kabul.

February 
28 February - The Taliban announce that the leader of operations and intelligence of Islamic State – Khorasan Province was killed during a raid in Kabul.

March 

 9 March - Three people, including Mohammad Dawood Muzamil, the Taliban-appointed governor of Balkh Province, are killed by an explosion at his office.

Scheduled 
 June – Afghan cricket team in Bangladesh 2023

References 

 
Afghanistan
Afghanistan
2020s in Afghanistan
Years of the 21st century in Afghanistan